BMC Software, Inc. is an American multinational information technology (IT) services and consulting, and Enterprise Software company based in Houston, Texas.

Gartner has positioned BMC as a Leader for the eighth consecutive years in Gartner's 2021 Magic Quadrant for IT Service Management Tools for its BMC Helix ITSM solution.

History 
The company was founded in Houston, Texas, by former Shell employees Scott Boulette, John Moores, and Dan Cloer, whose surname initials were adopted as the company name BMC Software. Moores served as the company's first CEO. The firm primarily wrote software for IBM mainframe computers, the industry standard at the time, but since the mid-1990s has been developing software to monitor, manage and automate both distributed and mainframe systems.

In 1987, Moores was succeeded by Richard A. Hosley II as CEO and President. In July 1988, BMC was re-incorporated in Delaware and went public with an initial public offering for BMC stock. The first day of trading was August 12, 1988. BMC stock was originally traded on the Nasdaq under the symbol BMCS and on the New York Stock Exchange with symbol BMC.

Acquisition and privatization by private equity firms 
In May 2013, BMC announced that it was being acquired by a group of major private equity investment groups for $6.9 billion. The process was completed in September 2013 and the company is no longer publicly traded.

It was announced on October 2, 2018 that BMC was acquired by KKR, a leading global investment firm. The company was acquired from a private investor group led by Bain Capital Private Equity and Golden Gate Capital together with GIC, Insight Venture Partners, and Elliott Management.

Products and services 

BMC Software specializes in software designed to enable an autonomous digital enterprise, developing products used for multiple functions including automation, service management, DevOps, workflow orchestration, AIOps, and security.

The company supports enterprises using mainframes with its Automated Mainframe Intelligence (AMI) product line, which enables self-managing mainframe systems. Self-managing mainframes use machine learning to improve efficiency by anticipating needs, sending alarms, and taking actions without the need for manual actions.

BMC's Control-M software is an application workflow orchestration platform that allows businesses to run hundreds of thousands of batch jobs daily and use the data to optimize complex business operations, such as supply chain management. Users can access all enterprise batch jobs through a single graphical interface. Control-M integrates with distributed storage systems such as HDFS, YARN, MapReduce and Apache Spark.  In 2019, the firm made the program available in a Docker container, allowing easy deployment to the public cloud or on-premises. The software has been named the overall leader in workload automation by  Enterprise Management Associates in each report since 2010. In 2020, the firm announced the launch of SaaS-based BMC Helix Control-M application workflow orchestration.

The TrueSight suite utilizes AI and machine learning to provide insights and network automation capabilities,  and includes TrueSight Operations Management, TrueSight Automation for Networks, TrueSight Automation for Servers, and TrueSight Orchestration.

Directors and staff 

The company was founded by John J. Moores in 1980; Moores was a "former Shell Oil computer specialist ... whose software made Shell's computers more efficient." Richard A. Hosley II was president and chief executive officer of BMC Software, Inc. from October 1987 until April 1990. Shortly after becoming president, Hosley took the company public in 1988. Hosley was succeeded by Max Watson Jr. in April 1990. Max Watson Jr. was chairman and chief executive officer of BMC Software from April 1990 to January 2001.

In 2001, BMC appointed the company director, Garland Cupp, as chairman, succeeding Max Watson, who quit the post in January 2001. Watson was succeeded as chairman and CEO by BMC's former senior vice president of product management and development, Robert Beauchamp.

In December 2016, Peter Leav succeeded Bob Beauchamp as president and chief executive officer. In October 2019, Ayman Sayed was named as President and CEO of BMC Software.

Notable acquisitions

See also 

List of companies in Houston
Remedy Corp
ServiceNow

References

External links 
 

Orchestration software
Job scheduling
Software companies based in Texas
Information technology consulting firms of the United States
International information technology consulting firms
Privately held companies based in Texas
Companies based in Houston
Software companies established in 1980
American companies established in 1980
Business software companies
Companies formerly listed on the Nasdaq
1980s initial public offerings
2018 mergers and acquisitions
Kohlberg Kravis Roberts companies
Software companies of the United States
Software performance management
2013 mergers and acquisitions